Bradley Nunatak is a prominent nunatak standing  southwest of Mount Tidd in the Pirrit Hills, Marie Byrd Land. The peak was positioned by the U.S. Ellsworth-Byrd Traverse Party on December 7, 1958, and named for Rev. Edward A. Bradley, S.J., seismologist with the party.

References 

Nunataks of Ellsworth Land